American Airlines Flight 63 was an American Airlines DC-3 nicknamed the Flagship Missouri that crashed on October 15, 1943, near Centerville, Tennessee, after ice formed on its wings and propeller. All eight passengers and three crewmembers died. This was the second fatal crash of an aircraft designated Flight 63, occurring  months after the crash of the Flagship Missouri’s sister ship, the Flagship Ohio.

Flight history 
American Airlines Flight 63 serviced a 6-leg domestic passenger service between Cleveland, Ohio, and Memphis, Tennessee. The full routing of the flight was Cleveland-Columbus-Dayton-Cincinnati-Louisville-Nashville-Memphis. Up until July 28, 1943, this route was serviced by the Flagship Missouri'''s sister ship, the Flagship Ohio. The Flagship Ohio was lost on the Louisville-Nashville leg of the flight, when the severe downdrafts of a nearby thunderstorm forced the DC-3 to crash into a field near Trammel, Kentucky.

After the loss of the Flagship Ohio, the Flagship Missouri covered Flight 63. The Flagship Missouri'' was a DC-3 built by the Douglas Aircraft Company for American Airlines. It had been  in service for seven years, since 1936, and had logged a total of 17,774 hours of flight time at the time of the crash. The three crewmembers were Captain Dale F. Dryer, pilot, First Officer W. J. Brand, and one stewardess.

Crash 
Flight 63 departed from Cleveland, Ohio, at 5:56 pm, 17 minutes behind schedule. The stops at Columbus, Dayton, Cincinnati, and Louisville were also delayed. By the time the flight departed Nashville, it was running 1 hour, 38 minutes late.

Ice which had formed on the wings and propellers of the aircraft made it impossible for the aircraft to maintain altitude.

Eyewitnesses told reporters that the plane "circled desperately" in search of a safe landing place before plummeting into a deep gulch. Local woodsmen observed the plane's landing attempts and later heard the crash, but were unable to summon help or report it due to the lack of telephones in the area. The wreckage was discovered the following morning by woodcutter John Durison.

The Civil Aeronautics Board investigated the crash and determined that ice that had formed on the propeller or wings made it impossible for the pilot to control the altitude of the aircraft.

The ten passengers included two captains and an aviation cadet, as well as a Texan and four Tennessee residents.

See also 
 American Airlines
 American Airlines Flight 63 (Flagship Ohio)
 Air Florida Flight 90 - another crash caused by icing
 American Airlines accidents and incidents
 List of accidents and incidents involving commercial aircraft

References

External links
 Final report of the Civil Aeronautics Board (Archive)

Airliner accidents and incidents caused by ice
Airliner accidents and incidents in Tennessee
Aviation accidents and incidents in the United States in 1943
63
Accidents and incidents involving the Douglas DC-3
Hickman County, Tennessee
1943 in Tennessee